Mangerton may refer to:

Mangerton, Dorset, a hamlet in England
Mangerton, New South Wales, a western suburb of the coastal city of Wollongong, New South Wales, Australia
Mangerton Mountain, and the Mangerton Mountain range, in Kerry, Ireland
Mangerton Tower, ruined Scottish castle of the Armstrong family